Kouassia-Niaguini (also spelled Kouassianiaguéné) is a town in the far east of Ivory Coast. It is a sub-prefecture of Transua Department in Gontougo Region, Zanzan District.

Kouassia-Nigaguini was a commune until March 2012, when it became one of 1126 communes nationwide that were abolished.

In 2014, the population of the sub-prefecture of Kouassia-Niaguini was 16,872.

Villages
The thirteen villages of the sub-prefecture of Kouassia-Niaguini and their population in 2014 are:
 Arrosua (1 983)
 Assuakô (1 523)
 Assuatifi (650)
 Baoulékoffikro (1 468)
 Dadiassé-Abrikokro (464)
 Essi-Kouakoukro (224)
 Kouadio-Dongokro (769)
 Kouadjo-Kissikro (793)
 Kouassi-Nianguini (1 738)
 Kroupikro (627)
 N'zuassé (2 810)
 Signahalé (2 047)
 Yao-Nango (1 776)

Notes

Sub-prefectures of Gontougo
Former communes of Ivory Coast